Tomaso Carcassi was a 1700s Florentine instrument maker. He often worked with his older sibling and business partner, Lorenzo Carcassi.

He and Lorenzo were probably students of Giovanni Baptista Gabrielli, another Florentine instrument maker.

References

Instrument makers
1700s in music
Businesspeople from Florence